Suez Steel is a steel company located in Adabia, Egypt.  As of September 2006, Banque du Caire, which owns or owned up to 80% of Suez Steel's stock, has offered the stock for sale. The company's stock is listed on the Egypt stock exchange.

It is now a subsidiary of military-linked National Service Products Organization, who owns 82% of the company.

External links
Egyptian Ministry of Investment Suez Steel profile page
Egyptian Ministry of Investment article on the Bank of Cairo's proposed sale of Suez Steel's stock

Steel companies of Egypt